Moscow City Duma District 28 is one of 45 constituencies in Moscow City Duma. The constituency has covered parts of Southern Moscow since 2014. From 1993-2005 District 28 was based in South-Western Moscow; however, after the number of constituencies was reduced to 15 in 2005, the constituency was eliminated.

Members elected

Election results

2001

|-
! colspan=2 style="background-color:#E9E9E9;text-align:left;vertical-align:top;" |Candidate
! style="background-color:#E9E9E9;text-align:left;vertical-align:top;" |Party
! style="background-color:#E9E9E9;text-align:right;" |Votes
! style="background-color:#E9E9E9;text-align:right;" |%
|-
|style="background-color:"|
|align=left|Viktor Volkov
|align=left|Independent
|
|20.55%
|-
|style="background-color:"|
|align=left|Mikhail Gromov
|align=left|Independent
|
|19.45%
|-
|style="background-color:"|
|align=left|Aleksandr Buzdakov
|align=left|Independent
|
|17.79%
|-
|style="background-color:"|
|align=left|Dmitry Shestakov
|align=left|Independent
|
|13.33%
|-
|style="background-color:#1042A5"|
|align=left|Aleksandr Stepovoy
|align=left|Union of Right Forces
|
|6.48%
|-
|style="background-color:"|
|align=left|Vladimir Rudakov
|align=left|Independent
|
|1.07%
|-
|style="background-color:#000000"|
|colspan=2 |against all
|
|16.88%
|-
| colspan="5" style="background-color:#E9E9E9;"|
|- style="font-weight:bold"
| colspan="3" style="text-align:left;" | Total
| 
| 100%
|-
| colspan="5" style="background-color:#E9E9E9;"|
|- style="font-weight:bold"
| colspan="4" |Source:
|
|}

2014

|-
! colspan=2 style="background-color:#E9E9E9;text-align:left;vertical-align:top;" |Candidate
! style="background-color:#E9E9E9;text-align:left;vertical-align:top;" |Party
! style="background-color:#E9E9E9;text-align:right;" |Votes
! style="background-color:#E9E9E9;text-align:right;" |%
|-
|style="background-color:"|
|align=left|Mikhail Antontsev (incumbent)
|align=left|United Russia
|
|45.29%
|-
|style="background-color:"|
|align=left|Marina Miroshina
|align=left|A Just Russia
|
|17.01%
|-
|style="background-color:"|
|align=left|Vladimir Kuimov
|align=left|Communist Party
|
|16.54%
|-
|style="background-color:"|
|align=left|Aleksey Yablokov
|align=left|Yabloko
|
|10.28%
|-
|style="background-color:"|
|align=left|Kirill Karov
|align=left|Liberal Democratic Party
|
|5.67%
|-
|style="background-color:"|
|align=left|Nikolay Zharmukhanov
|align=left|Independent
|
|1.92%
|-
| colspan="5" style="background-color:#E9E9E9;"|
|- style="font-weight:bold"
| colspan="3" style="text-align:left;" | Total
| 
| 100%
|-
| colspan="5" style="background-color:#E9E9E9;"|
|- style="font-weight:bold"
| colspan="4" |Source:
|
|}

2019

|-
! colspan=2 style="background-color:#E9E9E9;text-align:left;vertical-align:top;" |Candidate
! style="background-color:#E9E9E9;text-align:left;vertical-align:top;" |Party
! style="background-color:#E9E9E9;text-align:right;" |Votes
! style="background-color:#E9E9E9;text-align:right;" |%
|-
|style="background-color:"|
|align=left|Yelena Samyshina
|align=left|Independent
|
|38.80%
|-
|style="background-color:"|
|align=left|Arkady Pavlinov
|align=left|A Just Russia
|
|25.88%
|-
|style="background-color:"|
|align=left|Konstantin Lazarev
|align=left|Communist Party
|
|23.45%
|-
|style="background-color:"|
|align=left|Sergey Yeliseyev
|align=left|Liberal Democratic Party
|
|7.97%
|-
| colspan="5" style="background-color:#E9E9E9;"|
|- style="font-weight:bold"
| colspan="3" style="text-align:left;" | Total
| 
| 100%
|-
| colspan="5" style="background-color:#E9E9E9;"|
|- style="font-weight:bold"
| colspan="4" |Source:
|
|}

Notes

References

Moscow City Duma districts